The Guettioua Formation is a geological formation in Morocco. It dates back to the Middle Jurassic. It largely consists of sandstone, and is of continental origin. It is the lateral equivalent of the marine El Mers Formation.

Vertebrate fauna

See also
 List of dinosaur-bearing rock formations

References 

Geologic formations of Morocco
Jurassic System of Africa
Jurassic Morocco
Bathonian Stage
Sandstone formations
Siltstone formations
Marl formations
Ichnofossiliferous formations
Paleontology in Morocco